Mad cow disease is a neurodegenerative disease of cattle.

Mad cow may also refer to:

Arts
 Branded (2012 film), also known as The Mad Cow
 The Mad Cows, a British band
 Mad Cow Theatre, a Florida theatre company
 "Mad Cow", a 2012 single by Hank Williams III
 "Mad Cow Disease", a song by Goodbye Mr Mackenzie on the 1990 single "Blacker Than Black"

Other uses
 Mad Cow-Girl (1961–2010), British nurse and politician
 Red Cow interchange, nicknamed Mad Cow